

Carcuma  is a locality in the Australian state of South Australia located about  south-east of the state capital of Adelaide and about  south-east of the municipal seat in Tailem Bend.

Carcuma ’s boundaries were created on 24 August 2000 and given the “local established name” which is derived from either the pastoral property known as the “Carcuma Run“ or the cadastral unit of the Hundred of Carcuma.  Its boundaries do not include the place of the same name which is located to the west of the locality within the Hundred of Livingston and which is gazetted as an “unbounded locality”.

Land use within the locality is divided between ’primary production’ in its north and conservation in its south over the area proclaimed as the Carcuma Conservation Park.

The 2016 Australian census which was conducted in August 2016 reports that Carcuma had no people living within its boundaries.

Carcuma is located within the federal division of Barker, the state electoral district of Hammond and the local government area of the Coorong District Council.

References

Towns in South Australia